Garry Leo (born ) is an Australian former rugby league footballer who played in the 1960s and 1970s.

Background
He attended Fort Street Boys High School at Petersham and made the Combined High Schools rugby union team in which he was picked as a centre. While at school he also scored high marks in both Latin and French in his leaving certificate. Former New South Wales politician Rodney Cavalier has described Leo as "the only first-grade front-rower to ever get an "A" in Latin in the leaving".

Playing career
Leo was a prop-forward for the Balmain club. In a fantastic career that lasted eleven seasons, Garry Leo was graded straight into first grade with Balmain in 1963 and remained with the club until the end of the 1974 season. Leo played in over 150 games for the Tigers and he became club captain later in his career.

Leo won a premiership with Balmain in 1969 and also represented New South Wales on one occasion in 1967. After retiring from Balmain he joined Newcastle Norths as captain-coach in 1975.

References

Balmain Tigers players
New South Wales rugby league team players
Australian rugby league players
Living people
Rugby league locks
Year of birth missing (living people)